Oleksandr Yakovenko is a lieutenant colonel of the Armed Forces of Ukraine, participant in the Russo-Ukrainian war. He is a Hero of Ukraine with the award of the Order of the Golden Star.

Awards 
 the title of Hero of Ukraine with the award of the Order of the Golden Star (2022) — for personal courage and heroism shown in the defense of the state sovereignty and territorial integrity of Ukraine, loyalty to the military oath.

External links 
president.gov.ua About conferring the title of Hero of Ukraine

Living people

Year of birth missing (living people)
Recipients of the Order of Gold Star (Ukraine)